Marcella is a 1789 tragedy by the British writer William Hayley.

The original Drury Lane cast included John Philip Kemble as Hernandez, William Barrymore as Alonzo, John Whitfield as Lupercio, Robert Benson as Lopez, Richard Wroughton as Governor of Barcelona and Jane Powell as Marcella.

References

Bibliography
 Nicoll, Allardyce. A History of English Drama 1660-1900: Volume III. Cambridge University Press, 2009.
 Hogan, C.B (ed.) The London Stage, 1660-1800: Volume V''. Southern Illinois University Press, 1968.

1789 plays
Tragedy plays
West End plays
Plays by William Hayley